Andrey Petrov (born 13 October 1986) is an Uzbek long distance runner who specialises in the marathon. He competed in the men's marathon at the 2016 Summer Olympics. In 2019, he competed in the men's marathon at the 2019 World Athletics Championships held in Doha, Qatar. He finished in 49th place.

References

External links
 

1986 births
Living people
Uzbekistani male athletes
Olympic athletes of Uzbekistan
Athletes (track and field) at the 2016 Summer Olympics
Athletes (track and field) at the 2014 Asian Games
Athletes (track and field) at the 2018 Asian Games
Place of birth missing (living people)
Asian Games competitors for Uzbekistan
World Athletics Championships athletes for Uzbekistan
21st-century Uzbekistani people